"The Adventures of the Love Crusader" is a 1979 single by Sarah Brightman and the Starship Troopers. The single peaked at #53 in the UK charts.

Some pressings were made with red vinyl, and came with a comic book using the song lyrics as the dialogue.

Track listing 
 "The Adventures of the Love Crusader"
 "Lost in Space (The Nurgon Zone)"

References 

1979 singles
Sarah Brightman songs
1979 songs
Ariola Records singles
Song articles with missing songwriters
Song recordings produced by Steve Rowland